Bhauratar  is a village development committee in Parsa District in the Narayani Zone of southern Nepal. At the time of the 2011 Nepal census it had a population of 9,233 people living in 1,333 individual households. There were 4,863 males and 4,370 females at the time of census. The neighbouring villages are Gamariya, Bishrampur, Chhapkaiya and Phoolkawal belongs to Bahudarmai nagarpalika. The chhapkaiya tola and Phoolkawal previously belongs to Bhauratar village development committee. After occurrence of municipalities, these villages are now belong to  Bahudarmai Municipalities.

Noticeable Personalities 
Nitendra Prasad Sah Teli is the current mayor of Bahudarmai Municipality of Parsa district. Mr. Abhishesh Kumar Mehata is the one of well known scientist working in the field of drug delivery and cancer nanomedicine belongs to Bhauratar Chhapakaiya. He has completed his M.Pharm. from Indian Institute of Technology (BHU), Varanasi. He has worked in reputed Pharmaceutical Research's  R & D of Apotex Bangaluru and Sun Pharmaceutical Industries Ltd (formerly: Ranbaxy Laboratories), Gurugram  Haryana. Now, He is full time Research Scholar at Department of Pharmaceutical Engineering and Technology, IIT BHU, Varanasi, India.

References

Populated places in Parsa District